Hungry Joe is a butte in Dawson County, Montana, United States. It was named for an old prospector who lived nearby. According to the Works Progress Administration, "its summit, accessible by an easy hike over an old road, provides a view across the weird and bright-colored distortions of the badlands to the south."

References 

Buttes of Montana